Red Data Book of the Russian Federation (RDBRF), also known as Red Book or Russian Red Data Book, is a state document established for documenting rare and endangered species of animals, plants and fungi, as well as some local subspecies (such as the Ladoga seal) that exist within the territory of the Russian Federation and its continental shelf and marine economic zone. The book has been adopted by Russia to enact a common agreement on rare and endangered species protection.

Conservation 
The book provides a central information source in organizing studies and monitoring programs on rare and endangered species and their habitats.

History
The first Russian Red Data Book was based upon research conducted between 1961 and 1964 by a number of Soviet biologists. It represented the Soviet part of the IUCN Red List (hence the name). At that time it was just the Soviet Union's first organized list of endangered species, not a legislative document.

In the late 1960s, more thorough research was conducted by request of the Ministry of Agriculture. In 1974, based upon ecological evaluation, a decision was made to introduce legislation that would provide for the protection of endangered species. This resulted in the publication of the first official Red Book in 1978 – a document that complemented law as a list of endangered species. Animals on the list were strictly protected and their treatment regulated by Soviet law. Since that time, constant revisions have been made.

After the collapse of the Soviet Union, regulations on endangered species were instituted by each of the former Soviet countries. However, many of them had insufficient expertise and resources to maintain their lists and enforce common regulations; therefore, a common ecological treaty was made with mutual recognition of endangered species.

Cross-referencing 
Animals, plants and fungi listed in the IUCN-The World Conservation Union list of endangered species and inhabiting Russian territory, including the continental shelf and marine economic zone (whether permanently or temporarily) may be included to the RDBRF if this is necessary due to their number or status in Russia. The same is true for species protected by international conventions such as CITES.

Legal matters 
State legal recognition of the RDBRF is provided by the Russian Federation law "About protection of natural environment" (December 19, 1991), and by the Russian Federation law "About animal world" (May 5, 1995). The species listed in the RDBRF must be listed in the regional red data books of the Russian Federation subjects.

At the moment, the Russian Federation uses the 1998 edition of the RDBRF. A federal Red Data Book is complemented and expanded by regional Red Data Books that govern hunting within particular region, although instituting of regional Red Data Books is not compulsory. Regional CIS Red Data Books are direct descendants of their counterparts in the former USSR which were established in individual SSRs and in certain special areas. Even municipal-level territories at times issue their own Red Data Books.

Usually, a Red Book comes with a short description of protected species. However, in certain cases, it does not give all descriptions due to space limitations and in rare cases there is no formatted list in the book.

All of the CIS states currently implement Red Data Books.

Criticism of regional policies
Introduction of regional Red Books sometimes provokes negative reaction, up to "Red book Bacchanalia". It is alleged that funds which could have been used on more proactive ecological activities are being squandered on useless paperwork, since the federal RDBRF already fulfills all the requirements of such documents. In addition, allegations are made that local illegal animal traffickers use regional Red Books to track down endangered species.

Proponents of Red Books usually give the following reasons: the connection between illegal hunting and Red Books is unclear and not proven. Local biologists can be approached and bribed by illegal entrepreneurs with the same ease. Funds that are used to create these books do support local biological research. Additionally, regional Red Books allow for more accurate and diverse local environmental protection, like greater bird protection in cities and flora protection in Arctic regions.

Red Data Book categories and their explanations

See also

 IUCN Red List
 List of insects in the Red Data Book of India
 List of the vascular plants in the Red Data Book of India
 Regional Red List

References 
 Iliashenko, V.Yu. and E.I. Iliashenko. 2000. Krasnaya kniga Rossii: pravovye akty [Red Data Book of Russia: legislative acts]. State committee of the Russian Federation for Environmental Protection. Moscow. .

Ecology literature
IUCN Red List
Nature conservation in Russia